Hugues-Adhémar Cuénod (26 June 19026 December 2010) was a Swiss classical tenor and music educator known for his performances in international opera, operetta, both traditional and musical theatre, and on the concert stage, where he was particularly known for his clear, light, romantic and expressive poised interpretation of mélodie (French art song).

A master of diction and technique, his repertoire encompassed everything from the medieval chansons of Guillaume de Machaut, Elizabethan Love Songs, the sacred renaissance compositions of Claudio Monteverdi to the operas of Jacques Offenbach and the avant garde works of Igor Stravinsky, as well as recordings of lute songs.

Cuénod contributed to the revival of baroque music, performing compositions by Francesco Cavalli and others. A distinguished singer of Johann Sebastian Bach's music, he was particularly praised for his interpretation of the Evangelist in Bach's St Matthew Passion. He had the longest career of any recorded vocalist or performer in history: he gave his first performance in Paris in 1928, appearing in musical comedies, later in his career gravitating more towards concert and opera, he became best known in the role as Emperor Altoum, appearing opposite Plácido Domingo in Puccini's Turandot.

Career
Cuénod was born in Corseaux-sur-Vevey, Switzerland. His grandfather, William Cuenod was the mayor of Corseaux and he had half English ancestry through his grandmother, through his ancestry he was related to both the Churchill and Spencer family<ref>{{YouTube|hUWOBijPSAM|The Gift of Idleness – the life of Hugues Cuénod}}</ref> In 1913, aged 11, Cuénod attended the 78th birthday party of Camille Saint-Saëns, who played piano duets with Ignacy Jan Paderewski. He received his French-German music training at the Ribaupierre Institute in Lausanne, at the conservatories in Geneva and Basel, and in Vienna.
 
He started his career as a concert recitalist and singer. In 1928, he made his stage debut in Ernst Krenek's Jonny spielt auf in Paris, and in 1929 he sang for the first time in the United States in Noël Coward's Bitter Sweet. From 1930 to 1933, he was active in Geneva, and then in Paris from 1934 to 1937. During the seasons 1937 to 1939, he made an extensive concert tour of North America. From 1940 to 1946, he taught at the Geneva Conservatory.
 
In 1943 he resumed his operatic career singing in Johann Strauss II's Die Fledermaus in Geneva. He subsequently sang at Milan's La Scala (1951), the Glyndebourne Festival (from 1954 on) and London's Royal Opera House, Covent Garden (1954, 1956 and 1958). Cuénod was known for his roles as Basilio in Mozart's The Marriage of Figaro, the Astrologer in Rimsky-Korsakov's The Golden Cockerel, and a role written for him by Stravinsky, Sellem in The Rake's Progress. In pre-war Vienna and Paris, he frequented aristocratic salons and worked with Nadia Boulanger, with whom he made a pioneering set of recordings of madrigals by Monteverdi in 1937; after the war, the new early-music boom relied heavily on his light, unmannered, natural sound.

On February 4, 1969, Cuénod performed Renaissance music with American lutenist (and later composer) Raymond Lynch at the Smithsonian. In the 1970s he performed a number of recitals in the United States and France (Aix-en-Provence Festival, Radio France) with American lutenist Joel Cohen, recording in Switzerland with Cohen (and Swiss harpsichordist Christiane Jaccottet) an album of lute songs by Elizabethan composer John Dowland.

He holds the record as the oldest person to make a debut at the Metropolitan Opera. He debuted as the Emperor Altoum in Giacomo Puccini's Turandot on 12 March 1987 at the age of 84. He repeated the role the following season for a total of 14 performances. His very last appearance on stage was in 1994, aged 90, when he sang M. Triquet in Tchaikovsky's Eugene Onegin at the Théâtre du Jorat in Mézières. After retiring from the concert circuit, he became an educator of the musical arts in England, with Belgian international soprano Suzanne Danco.

Awards and honours
Cuénod's recording of Erik Satie's Socrate in the 1970s, released on Nimbus Records, won the Grand Prix du Disque Mondiale award at the Montreux Music Festival. In 1976 he was awarded the Chevalier des Arts et des Lettres. On his centenary in 2002, he was awarded the World of Song award by the Lotte Lehmann Foundation.

Personal life
Cuénod's native language was French, but he was fluent in English, German and Italian. He resided with his life partner, Alfred Augustin (41 years his junior), in the Vaud region of Switzerland. They lived in the Château de Lully, an 18th-century castle that belonged to his grandfather, who purchased the property in 1899.

In June 2007, when Cuénod was 105, he and Augustin entered into a civil union after changes in Swiss law gave same-sex couples many of the legal benefits of marriage.
Cuénod became a centenarian in 2002, and died aged 108, on 6 December 2010 at his home in Vevey, Switzerland.

References

Sources
 

Further reading
 Bradley S. Klapper, Tenor Cuénod, 105, Credits Small Voice, Associated Press, 25 June 2007. Retrieved on 14 February 2008.
 Nicolas Slonimsky et al., Baker's Biographical Dictionary of Twentieth-Century Classical Musicians, Schirmer Books, 1997. 
 "The Gift of Idleness" by Rob Godfrey, 9 September 2014
 Jérôme Spycket, Un diable de musicien: Hugues Cuénod'', Payot, 1979. 
 Profile from the Lotte Lehmann Foundation (includes a one-hour Internet radio program focusing on Cuénod)

External links
 
 Discography, medieval.org

1902 births
2010 deaths
Gay singers
Swiss gay musicians
Swiss LGBT singers
People from Riviera-Pays-d'Enhaut District
Swiss centenarians
20th-century Swiss male opera singers
Swiss operatic tenors
Swiss music educators
Chevaliers of the Ordre des Arts et des Lettres
Swiss people of English descent
French-language singers of Switzerland
Men centenarians